The Fifth Kohl cabinet led by Helmut Kohl was sworn in on 15 November 1994 and laid down its function on 27 October 1998. The cabinet was formed after the 1994 elections. It laid down its function after the formation of the Cabinet Schröder I, which was formed following the 1998 elections.

Composition

|}

References

Kohl
1994 establishments in Germany
1998 disestablishments in Germany
Cabinets established in 1994
Cabinets disestablished in 1998
Helmut Kohl